Nagaram  is a 2008 Indian Telugu-language action film produced by M. Anjibabu, P. Kishore Babu on Mac Media-Blue Sky Entertainment banner and directed by C. C. Srinivas. The film stars Srikanth, Jagapati Babu, Kaveri Jha  and music composed by Chakri. The film is loosely based on Tamil film Thalai Nagaram (2006) which itself was remake of Malayalam film Abhimanyu (1991).

Plot
Right is a noted riotous in the city but is more known for his good deeds. He works as a henchman to a big-time mafia leader Qaasim Bhai that uses Right & his gang as professional killers. ACP Chowdhary a sheer cop believes in cosmic law by eliminating criminals. Navya is a Ph.D. student who makes research on criminals. So, she enters into Right's life from there onwards a dramatic change rises in his life and they fall in love. As an eventual result, a brawl arises between Right and Qaasim. Moreover, Right kills Kaasim's son Nazaar Bhai. But unfortunately, Right's henchmen Balu also dies in the contest which evokes the Right and he surrenders to Chowdary, who gives him a chance to reform. After some time, Chowdhary has moved away by Qaasim, and a corrupt ACP in his place. These brutal slaughters Right's team, including his sister Lavanya. Shortly before Right's encounter, Chowdary backs for his protection. At last, two cease the baddies.

Cast

Srikanth as Right
Jagapati Babu as ACP Chowdary
Kaveri Jha as Nadiya
Pradeep Rawat as Qaasim Bhai
Bhuvaneswari as Qaasim Bhai's trophy wife
Kalabhavan Mani as New ACP
Brahmanandam as Mani
Ali
Ajay as Balu
G. V. Sudhakar Naidu as Nazaar Bhai
Raghu Babu as Shankar Dada
L. B. Sriram as Lecturer
Satyam Rajesh as ATM
Jaya Prakash Reddy as Gudisala Narayana Murthy
Sivaji Raja as Inspector Swamy
Ravi Varma as Vikram
Chinna as Chinna
Gundu Hanumantha Rao
Dharmavarapu Subramanyam
Venu Madhav
Subbaraya Sharma
Meena as Lavanya
Prabhu as Right's henchman
Raghu as Right's henchman
Bhargavi as Balu's wife
Prasanna Kumar as Police Inspector
Ram Jagan as Constable Gundu
Vizag Prasad as Commissioner
K. Ashok Kumar as Minister
Kadambari Kiran as Auto Driver
Bhauvaneswari as Vaani
Vallabhaneni Janardhan as Rajugaru
Gundu Sudarshan
 Rajitha
Apoorva
Master Gaurav as Pandu
Manisha Koirala as an item number

Soundtrack

The music was composed by Chakri and released on MADHURA Audio Company.

References

External links 
 

2008 action films
2008 films
Indian action films
Films scored by Chakri
2000s Telugu-language films